Benoist is a type of British-style tea marketed in Japan.  The brand was greatly popularised by the Japanese book (largely a compilation of the original 2channel threads in which the eponymous poster presented his situation) and subsequent movie Densha Otoko, where sales reportedly tripled as a result of being featured in the movie. The drama (presenting information from a 2channel posting included in the book) claimed that Benoist is the only tea company to hold a set of three Royal Warrants, specifically by the Queen, the Prince of Wales, and the Queen Mother.  However, there is no evidence to support this claim, and a search of the Royal Warrant Holders Association website reveals this to actually be true of R. Twining & Co.

References

External links
 The Royal Warrant Holders Association
 Benoist official website (Japanese)

Tea brands in Japan